La Chèvre (English title: Knock on Wood, literal translation: The She-goat) is a 1981 French buddy cop comedy film written and directed by Francis Veber, starring Pierre Richard and Gérard Depardieu. It is the first of three films featuring Richard and Depardieu as a comic duo.

An American remake of this film was made in 1991, starring Martin Short and Danny Glover, entitled Pure Luck.

Plot
La Chèvre features Depardieu as the tough-guy private detective Campana, hired to find Marie, the daughter of a rich businessman, who has mysteriously disappeared while vacationing in Mexico. The case turns out to be complicated – several attempts to find her have already failed. A psychologist, Meyer, who works for the businessman, suggests a plan. Marie is known to be extremely unlucky and accident-prone; the psychologist advises sending someone equally accident-prone to find her, on the theory that what happened to her may also happen to him, and thus, following her steps while the detective tags along, the daughter can be found and returned home. Richard's character Perrin is an awkward, accident-prone accountant who works for the businessman, and is chosen to implement the scheme. The adventures of those serious detective and unlucky guy begins...

Cast
 Pierre Richard as François Perrin
 Gérard Depardieu as Campana
 Pedro Armendáriz Jr. as The Captain
 Corynne Charbit as Marie Bens
 Maritza Olivares		
 André Valardy as Meyer
  as Arbal
 Sergio Calderón as Prisoner
 Michel Robin as Alexandre Bens
 Robert Dalban as The technician

Release history and facts

The movie is infamous in Italy for a Cinema Statuto fire in a cinema in Turin in which it was projected, killing 64 people.

Reception
The film received favorable reviews, with praise for Richard and Depardieu's performances, story and humour.
The film was nominated for Best Foreign Language Film of 1985 by the U.S. National Board of Review of Motion Pictures.

References

La Chevre/Knock On Wood at Films de France site.

External links

 
  Trailer

1981 films
1980s adventure comedy films
French comedy road movies
1980s comedy road movies
Mexican comedy films
1980s French-language films
Films directed by Francis Veber
Films with screenplays by Francis Veber
Films scored by Vladimir Cosma
French adventure comedy films
1980s buddy comedy films
1981 comedy films
Films about accountants
1980s French films
1980s Mexican films